The Genesis G90 is a full-size luxury sedan manufactured by the Korean automaker Genesis, which is the luxury vehicle division of Hyundai Motor Company, since 2015. The G90 is the successor of the Hyundai Equus and was known as the Genesis EQ900 in South Korea from 2015 to 2019. 



First generation (HI; 2015)
The Genesis G90 debuted in South Korea on December 9, 2015 as the Genesis EQ900.

The US market debut took place at the 2016 North American International Auto Show and went on sale in September of 2016 at Genesis retailers as 2017 model year vehicles. Powertrains available included the 3.3T, 3.3T HTRAC, 5.0, 5.0 HTRAC.

All models have an eight-speed automatic transmission with shiftronic and is also available with rear-wheel drive or all-wheel drive (HTRAC).

Pre-facelift

Facelift (2018) 
A restyled G90 debuted in Korea on November 27, 2018. The EQ900 was also renamed as the G90 for the Korean market.

EQ900L/G90L
The G90L is a long wheelbase version of the G90. It was initially sold in Korea as the EQ900L and later renamed to the G90L after the 2018 exterior update. The G90L is available only as a V8 5.0L AWD (HTRAC).

Pre-facelift

Facelift

Engines

Second generation (RS4; 2021) 
The exterior design was unveiled on November 30, 2021. Genesis' family look, a two-line lamp was applied. The cube-shaped projection light incorporates a white light, a daytime driving light, and a direction indicator light. Two rows of rear lamps are also long on the back. The second-generation G90 was released in two models: a general model and a long-wheelbase model.

The long-wheelbase model is further supported by a 48-volt mild hybrid system with an electric supercharger for additional power. All-wheel drive is standard on the long-wheelbase model.

Long Wheelbase (LWB) 
The second-generation G90 is available in a long wheelbase, which gains an additional  over the standard car.

Powertrain

Sales
As of November 2015, a day after pre-order began, pre-orders of EQ900 in South Korea reached 4,342 units. As December 2015, pre-orders of G90 exceeded 10,000 units.

References

External links

Flagship vehicles
Limousines
Full-size vehicles
Sedans
G90